Jürgen Werner (born April 27, 1967) is a retired Austrian international footballer.

References

1967 births
Living people
Austrian footballers
Austria international footballers
LASK players

Association football defenders